North Dorset District Council in Dorset, England existed from 1974 to 2019, when it was abolished and subsumed into Dorset Council.

Political control
From the first election to the council in 1973 until its abolition in 2019, political control was held by the following parties:

Leadership
The leaders of the council from 2012 until the council's abolition in 2019 were:

Council elections
1973 North Dorset District Council election
1976 North Dorset District Council election
1979 North Dorset District Council election
1983 North Dorset District Council election (New ward boundaries)
1987 North Dorset District Council election
1991 North Dorset District Council election (District boundary changes took place but the number of seats remained the same)
1995 North Dorset District Council election
1999 North Dorset District Council election
2003 North Dorset District Council election (New ward boundaries)
2007 North Dorset District Council election
2011 North Dorset District Council election
2015 North Dorset District Council election (New ward boundaries)

District result maps

By-election results

References

North Dorset election results
By-election results

External links
North Dorset District Council

 
Council elections in Dorset
North Dorset District
District council elections in England